Leidyana erratica is a single-celled, eukaryotic parasite of the cricket Gryllus pennsylvanicus.

References

Conoidasida